Ary-Tolon (Arıı Toloon) is a rural locality (a selo) in Bayagantaysky Rural Okrug of Tomponsky District in the Sakha Republic, Russia, located  from Khandyga, the administrative center of the district and  from Krest-Khaldzhay, the administrative center of the rural okrug. Its population as of the 2002 Census was 172.

References

Notes

Sources
Official website of the Sakha Republic. Registry of the Administrative-Territorial Divisions of the Sakha Republic. Tomponsky District. 

Rural localities in Tomponsky District